The McCallum Theatre is a 1,127-seat theatre and concert venue located on the southern edge of the campus of College of the Desert in Palm Desert, California, US.
It was built by and is operated by an independent non-profit corporation, Friends of the Cultural Center, Inc.

History
McCallum Theatre Education, the theatre's educational outreach division, was founded in 1997. It offers arts literacy experiences for approximately 40,000 children, parents,
and educators annually, both at the McCallum and in area classrooms. Participation has steadily increased and, this year, the McCallum will partner with 25 area schools, 303 classrooms,
and more than 8,000 students, representing about 70 percent of valley schools. Close to 2,300 individual classroom workshops will be facilitated by McCallum Theatre Education teaching artists during the 2017–2018 season.

As a nonprofit organization, the McCallum is governed by a volunteer board of trustees with the fundraising assistance of The Muses & Patroness Circle, a women's leadership council that raises funds for the educational activities of the McCallum Theatre.

Buildings and structures in Riverside County, California
Performing arts centers in California
Tourist attractions in Riverside County, California
Theatres completed in 1988